Aruna Vasudev (born 1936) is an Indian critic, author, editor, painter, maker of documentaries and is considered an eminent scholar on Asian cinema, who has also been described as the "mother of Asian Cinema".

Early life and education 
A younger sister of Uma Vasudeva, she was born in 1936. After marrying Sunil Kumar Roy, an Indian diplomat, she chose to retain her maiden name. 

His Excellency Sunil Roy died in New York from cancer in 1993, having previously served as Indian Ambassador to Poland, then Mexico, and High Commissioner to Nigeria.

In the early 1960s, she attended film classes in New York where her father was working and created a number of short documentaries after her return to India. She received a doctorate from the University of Paris on cinema and censorship. Her PhD thesis was published as a book titled Liberty and Licence in the Indian Cinema in 1979.

Career 
Vasudev currently serves as director of Osian's-Connoisseurs of Art Private Limited. She is also one of the Trustees of the Public Service Broadcasting Trust in India.

She started as a greenhorn helping in the makeup rooms of Doordarsan in 1960.

She launched Cinemaya in 1988 as a publication that showcases filmmakers from Asia. In 1991, she founded the internationally renowned NETPAC as an organisation to forward the cause of Asian films.

Since 1990, she has been the President or Jury Member of international film festivals including Karlovy Vary, Locarno, Cannes (Camera d'Or), Las Palmas, Pusan, Singapore, Fajr (Tehran), and Antalya.

Honours and awards

Honours
Appointed Cavaliere della Stella della Solidarietà Italiana in 2004, in 2019 Vasudev was honoured by the French Government as Officier des Arts et des Lettres, the highest accolades from two major film-producing countries, Italy and France.

Awards
In 1997, Vasudev won the Korean Cinema Award at the Pusan International Film Festival.

In 2006, Vasudev received a Lifetime Achievement Award at the Cinemanila International Film Festival.

In 2015, Vasudev was honored with a Lifetime Achievement Award at the 2nd edition of the International Film Festival of Colombo for her contributions towards putting Asian cinema on the international map. At the Hawaii International Film Festival the same year, Vasudev won a Vision in Film Award.

The Tripoli Film Festival has named its prize for Best Writing on Cinema as the “Aruna Vasudev Award”.

References

External links
IMDB profile
Cinemaya official website
German Wikipage on Aruna Vasudev
25 years of NETPAC

1936 births
Living people
Indian editors
21st-century Indian people
Officiers of the Ordre des Arts et des Lettres